UFC Fight Night: Thompson vs. Pettis (also known as UFC Fight Night 148 or UFC on ESPN+ 6) was a mixed martial arts event produced by the Ultimate Fighting Championship that was held on March 23, 2019 at Bridgestone Arena in Nashville, Tennessee.

Background
A welterweight bout between former two-time title challenger Stephen Thompson and former WEC and UFC Lightweight Champion Anthony Pettis served as the event headliner.

A bantamweight bout between Martin Day and Chris Gutiérrez was scheduled for the event. However, it was reported that Day was pulled from the bout due to injury and he was replaced by Ryan MacDonald.

Marlon Vera was expected to face Frankie Saenz in a bantamweight bout at UFC 235. However, the bout was cancelled on fight week when Vera pulled out due to illness. The bout was rescheduled and eventually took place at this event.

Nasrat Haqparast and Chris Gruetzemacher pulled out of their respective bouts, due to injury, against John Makdessi and Jesús Pinedo. In turn, Makdessi and Pinedo ended up facing each other.

At the weigh-ins, Luis Peña weighed in at 148.5 lb, 2.5 pounds over the featherweight non-title fight limit of 146 lb. He was fined 30% of his fight purse and his bout against Steven Peterson proceeded at catchweight.

Results

Bonus awards
The following fighters were awarded $50,000 bonuses:
Fight of the Night: Bryce Mitchell vs. Bobby Moffett 
Performance of the Night: Anthony Pettis and Randa Markos

See also 

 List of UFC events
 2019 in UFC
 List of current UFC fighters

References 

UFC Fight Night
2019 in mixed martial arts
2019 in sports in Tennessee
Mixed martial arts in Tennessee
Sports competitions in Nashville, Tennessee
March 2019 sports events in the United States